New York's 62nd State Assembly district is one of the 150 districts in the New York State Assembly. It has been represented by Republican Michael Reilly since 2019.

Geography
District 62 is in southern Staten Island. It represents portions of the South Shore and Mid Island.

Recent election results

2022

2020

2018

2016

2016 special

2014

2012

2010

2008

References

62